Ryan Lee is a Korean American hedge fund manager in Los Angeles, California. He is currently a managing director at Rodeo Acquisition Partners as well as the economic analyst correspondent on K Radio AM1230. Lee was born in the Republic of Korea and grew up in Southern California. He has studied Bachelor of Arts in Economics at University of California, Los Angeles (UCLA), and has also served in the U.S. Air Force for six years.

In 2011, Lee was appointed by Lee Myung-bak (President of South Korea) as the youngest council member in the National Unification Advisory Council.

See also
List of University of California, Los Angeles people

References

External links
Column archives at [Sports Seoul USA]
Column archives at [Sports Seoul USA]
Column archives at [JYT News]

American hedge fund managers
Living people
South Korean emigrants to the United States
University of California, Los Angeles alumni
Year of birth missing (living people)